Our Last Album? is a studio album by the punk band Toy Dolls. It is a loose concept album about the album being their last, until it is explained in "Our Last Outro?" that it isn't.

Critical reception
AllMusic called the album full of "highly melodic, pun-filled nuggets," writing that "it's a bit shocking how vibrant [Toy Dolls] still sound given how predictable the Dolls' methodology has become."

Track listing
  "Our Last Intro?"  – 0:21
  "The Death of Barry the Roofer with Vertigo"  – 2:52
  "Cheatin' Chick from China"  – 2:45
  "Davey's Days"  – 3:33
  "No One Knew the Real Emu"  – 3:10
  "I Gave My Heart to a Slag Called Sharon from Whitley Bay"  – 3:50
  "Jean's Been"  – 2:22
  "Rita's Innocent"  – 3:05
  "She's So Modern"  – 2:54
  "Chenky Is a Puff"  – 2:57
  "I Caught It from Camilla"  – 2:57
  "Our Last Outro?"  – 1:17
  "The Final Countdown (Europe cover)"  – 3:03
  "Tony Talks Tripe"  – 2:16
  "Yul Brynner Was a Skinhead (New Recording)"  – 2:24
  "Thank You To"  – 0:28

Personnel
 Michael "Olga" Algar — Vocals, Guitar
 Tommy Goober — Bass, Vocals
 Dave "The Nut" Nuttall — Drums, Vocals

References

External links
 Our Last Album? page on The Toy Dolls website

Toy Dolls albums
2004 albums